The 2022 Open de Oeiras III was a professional tennis tournament played on clay courts. It was the seventh edition of the tournament which was part of the 2022 ATP Challenger Tour. It took place in Oeiras, Portugal between 20 and 26 June 2022.

Singles main-draw entrants

Seeds

 1 Rankings are as of 13 June 2022.

Other entrants
The following players received wildcards into the singles main draw:
  Pedro Araújo
  Tiago Cação
  João Domingues

The following player received entry into the singles main draw as an alternate:
  Kyrian Jacquet

The following players received entry from the qualifying draw:
  Thomaz Bellucci
  Pedro Boscardin Dias
  Lucas Gerch
  Oscar José Gutierrez
  Alexandar Lazarov
  Alex Rybakov

Champions

Singles

  Kaichi Uchida def.  Kimmer Coppejans 6–2, 6–4.

Doubles

  Sadio Doumbia /  Fabien Reboul def.  Robert Galloway /  Alex Lawson 6–3, 3–6, [15–13].

References

2022 ATP Challenger Tour
June 2022 sports events in Portugal
2022 in Portuguese sport